Wellycon is the largest board game convention in New Zealand.

The Wellycon Convention is held annually in Wellington, New Zealand on the Saturday and Sunday of Queen's Birthday Weekend (now Kings Birthday Weekend as of 2022). The first Wellycon was held in 2008, with numbers steadily increasing (except when covid-restricted) e.g. Wellycon XI held in 2018 at Wellington Girls' College, with over 600 attendees.  The focus of the con is on having space and time to play games onsite, in contrast to many sci-fi/fantasy or board game trade fairs such as Spiel (the largest board game convention in the world).  The totally volunteer-run committee works hard to fulfil the tag-line "the biggest, fun, friendly board game convention in NZ" with over 60 volunteers facilitating at the event.

Special events 
The 2018 Wellycon offered an exclusive promo card for the Spiel des Jahres-nominated boardgame Raiders of the North Sea.

The 2019 Wellycon featured four international game premieres for the southern hemisphere (at the same time as UK Games Expo release for the northern hemisphere).

The 2021 Wellycon had the first National Catan Tournament. The winner qualified as the New Zealand representative for the Catan World Championships in Malta, Nov 2022.

The 2022 Wellycon had the first 'prototype event' where game designers play-tested their prototypes with many attendees and a prize draw was held for those who had given feedback.

History 
The event was founded by Andrew Rea, Ian Anderson and Peter Freer, 3 keen enthusiasts.  For more on the history see https://www.wellycon.org.nz/history/.

Theme Game, Location & Attendance figures

Theme dice (collectable)

2022 
Chessex Dice -  Vortex Bright Green with black pips; design replacing the 1 side.  Colours chosen based on theme game everdell box cover.  Designed by Rob Digby.

2021 
Chessex Dice -   Translucent Orange with white pips with  design replacing the 1 side.  Colours chosen based on expansion box colours - Wingspan Oceania.  Designed by Rob Digby.

2020 
Chessex Dice - Colours based on theme game box - Orleans.  Designed by Rob Digby.

2019 
Chessex Dice -   three sets created to go with codenames theme.  400 Red, 400 Blue, 200 neutral (to match with proportions in Codenames)

Marble Ivory with blackpips with  design replacing the 1 side.  

Scarab Scarlet with gold pips with  design replacing the 1 side.  

Scarab Royal Blue with gold pips with  design replacing the 1 side.  

Colours based on theme game - Codenames.  Artwork authorised by CGE games.  Designed by Rob Digby.

2018 
Chessex Dice - Nebula Dark Blue with white pips with  design replacing the 1 side.  Colours based on theme game - Raiders of the North Sea (spiel des Jahres nominee from local Kapiti resident, Shem Phillips) - to look like the ship is on the sea.  Designed by Rob Digby.

2017 - 10th anniversary dice - D10 & D6 
Chessex Dice - Gemini green-purple with gold pips with  design replacing the 1 side.  Colours based on theme - pirates.  Designed by Rob Digby. 

A full set of all the dice created to date were reprinted in limited numbers and sold as sets, with the anniversary D10 making up the 10th in the set.  They came in a dice bag with hand printed (by the committee!) Wellycon W on the front.  NOTE: All the 10th anniversary reprints were done on the 6 side, so some dice in this set are different from their original printing.

2016 
Chessex Dice -   Gemini Copper-Steel with white pips with Roman laurel wreath design replacing the 1 side.  Colours based on theme - Romans (first time just generic theme).  Designed by Rob Digby.

2015 
Chessex Dice -  Gemini black-red with Gold pips with logo in style of ticket to ride words replacing the 1 side.  Colours based on theme game - Ticket to Ride.  Designed by Craig Gulow.

2014 
Chessex Dice - Gemini Blue-purple with Gold pips and “Meeple juggling dice” replacing the 1 side.  Colours based on theme game - 7 Wonders.  Designed by Craig Gulow.

2013 
Chessex Dice - Black die with gold pips and “The One Ring” replacing the 1 pip side. Designed by Peter Freer.

2012 
Chessex Dice - Pale blue die with gold pips and a winged scarab replacing the 6 pip side. Designed by Peter Freer.

2011 
Chessex Dice - Dark blue die with gold pips and a “Carcassonne” W replacing  the 6 pip side. Designed by Peter Freer.

2010 
Chessex Dice - Pale blue die with gold pips and a crowned W replacing the 1 pip side. Designed by Peter Freer.

2009 
Chessex Dice - Yellow die with black pips, design replaces 1 pip.  Actually brighter yellow than shown in these pictures.

2008 
There was no die - confirmed by Andrew Rae (Wellycon founder) in 2014.

Covid impact 
In 2020, the main convention was postponed to October due to limits on gathering numbers during the COVID-19 pandemic. An online event was held using Zoom and BoardGameArena.

In 2021, although it was held in June as normal, the restriction to 200 in a venue at a time, meant numbers were necessarily limited.  The committee aimed to ensure as many people as possible could attend by having 4 half-day sessions instead of one 2-day event.

In 2022, the main convention was postponed to October due to the country being in Red traffic light status at the time the decision had to be made whether to go ahead in June.

References

External links
 Official Wellycon webpage

June events
Gaming conventions
Events in Wellington
Conventions in New Zealand